Coryssiphus is a genus of spiders in the family Liocranidae. It was first described in 1903 by Simon. , it contains 3 species, all in South Africa.

References

Liocranidae
Araneomorphae genera
Spiders of South Africa